Sphaerophoria contigua is a species of syrphid fly in the family Syrphidae.

References

Further reading

External links

 
 

Syrphini
Insects described in 1847